Jervis Ricardo Alfonso Lyte (30 April 1967 – 8 March 2013), known professionally as Ricardo da Force, was an English vocalist, rapper, and DJ, most notable for contributing vocals to house and dance music tracks of The KLF and N-Trance.  He got his stage name from a track he rapped by the band X-10-CIV called "The Force" along with Shola Phillips.

Later in his life, he was resident DJ at 'The Apartment' in Dubai.

Lyte died on 8 March 2013 while in Barbados.

Discography

References

External links
 
 

1967 births
2013 deaths
British dance musicians
Black British male rappers
English male rappers